Nik is a masculine given name. It may also refer to:

Places in Iran:
Nik, alternate name of Nik Shahr, a city
Nik, alternate name of Novik, Iran, a village
Nik, alternate name of Nig, Iran, a village
Nik, South Khorasan, a village

Other uses:
 -nik, an English suffix of Slavic origin
 NIK, the Supreme Audit Office (Poland) (Najwyższa Izba Kontroli)
 MAP3K14, NFkB Inducing Kinase
 Nik Software, producer of image processing applications

See also
 Nick (disambiguation)